Jaak Leimann (born 1 March 1941 in Võru) is an Estonian economist and politician.

From 1990 to 1992 and 1996 to 1999, he was Minister of Economic Affairs.

References

Living people
1941 births
21st-century Estonian economists
Government ministers of Estonia
Estonian Coalition Party politicians
Tallinn University of Technology alumni
Academic staff of the Tallinn University of Technology
Novosibirsk State University alumni
Aalto University alumni
People from Võru